The 2020 Kentucky State Senate elections took place as part of the biennial 2020 United States elections. Kentucky voters elected state senators in half of the state senate's districts – the 19 even-numbered state senate districts. State senators serve four-year terms in the Kentucky Senate, with half of the seats up for election each cycle.

A statewide map of the 39 state Senate districts in the 2020 elections is provided by the Kentucky General Assembly here.

The primary election on June 23, 2020, determined which candidates will appear on the November 3 general election ballot. The filing deadline was January 10.

Republicans gained a veto-proof majority in the Kentucky Senate following the 2020 general election, picking up 2 seats.

Predictions

Summary of results 

 NOTE: The 19 even-numbered districts did not hold elections in 2020 so they are not listed here.

Source:

Closest races 
Seats where the margin of victory was under 10%:
  gain
  gain

Detailed Results 

 Reminder: Only odd-numbered Kentucky Senate seats were up for election in 2020; therefore, even-numbered seats were not having elections in 2020 & are not shown.

 Note: If a district does not list a primary, then that district did not having a competitive primary (i.e., there may have only been one candidate file for that district).

District 1

District 3

District 5

District 7

District 9

District 11

District 13

District 15

District 17

District 19

District 21

District 23

District 25

District 27

District 29

District 31

District 33

District 35

District 37

See also 

 2020 Kentucky elections
 2020 United States House of Representatives elections in Kentucky
 Elections in Kentucky
 2020 United States elections

References 

Senate
Kentucky Senate elections
Kentucky Senate